Groesbeck Creek is a stream in Texas which is a tributary of the Red River.

Groesbeck Creek is formed at the confluence of two tributaries – North and South Groesbeck creeks. North Groesbeck Creek heads in Childress County at the eastern edge of the small town of Childress, Texas. South Groesbeck Creek heads  to the southeast of Childress and generally flows eastward to a confluence with North Groesbeck Creek to form Groesbeck Creek (proper)  to the north-northeast of Quanah in Hardeman County, Texas.

See also
List of rivers of Texas

References

External links

USGS Hydrologic Unit Map - State of Texas (1974)

Rivers of Texas
Tributaries of the Red River of the South